Humberto Rodriguez Calderon, known as El Gato, (born 3 August 1968 in Bogota, Colombia) is a radio personality and television host. Calderon has hosted programs on Spanish language stations in the Dominican Republic, Colombia and Florida. In August 2011, he replaced Hernan Orjuela as the host of the long-running comedy program Sábados Felices.

Career
Journalist of Universidad Jorge Tadeo Lozano in Bogotá, Colombia, and Advertising Graduate of Universidad Católica in Santo Domingo, Dominican Republic. Humberto  started his radio career in 99.5 Listin in the Dominican Republic, where he was also on television. He worked as sound engineer for the majority of musicians in that Caribbean country at the end of the 1980s and the first part of the 1990s.
He returned to Colombia as part of radio networks like La Mega from R.C.N., Radioactiva, Caracol Estereo and Caracol Colombia from Caracol TV network, as well as a t.v. host in investigative journalism, public opinion and entertainment shows like Sin Reserva, Laberinto and before he established in the United States, Radiocity of the Citytv channel in Bogotá.

He was one of the anchors in the TV magazine “De Todo Un Poco” in south Florida seen through channel 22, was international correspondent and host of radio shows for 88.9 la Super Estación Colombia from the Super network; was news editor and voice for the Latino Broadcasting Corporation (LBC), worked for the Grupo Latino de Radio (GLR) as editor and producer of Minuto 60 in the U.S., and as a voice-over  he is one of the most quoted for brands as Ford, Subway, Winn Dixie, FPL, Florida Lotto, BB&T, Tire Kingdom among others. At the same time, his voice can be heard in Telemundo Network  and the Discovery Channel  for Latin America.

Humberto hosted Canal Caracol’s reality show “Tengo Una Illusión”  in Colombia, and was the anchor and director of the radio show “EL METRO”  which aired through the station 1210 am in South Florida.
“El Gato” co-hosted the TV show “Todo Bebé” in the U.S.

He then hosted the morning show at Mega 94.9 FM (Clear Channel) in South Florida. Also the afternoon drive in more than twelve radio stations across the U.S., part of the Premium Choice content of the company.

In 2011 he becomes the host of “Sábados Felices” (Canal Caracol), the most popular comedy show in Colombia.

At the same time, Humberto begins co-hosting “Pase VIP”, an entertainment magazine for V-me, the fastest-growing Hispanic TV Network in the U.S.

EL Gato is currently on air on La Nueva i95.7 owned by Spanish Broadcast Systems.

References

External links 
 (http://lavozdelgato.com/)
 (http://www.mega949.com/pages/ElGato.html)
 (http://www.caracoltv.com/sabadosfelices)

1968 births
Living people
People from Bogotá
Colombian radio presenters
Colombian television presenters